Krešimir Crnković  (born 4 January 1995) is a Croatian biathlete and cross-country skier who competes internationally.
 
He participated in cross-country skiing at the 2018 Winter Olympics.

Biathlon results
All results are sourced from the International Biathlon Union.

World Championships
0 medals

*During Olympic seasons competitions are only held for those events not included in the Olympic program.
**The single mixed relay was added as an event in 2019.

References

External links

1995 births
Living people
Croatian male biathletes 
Croatian male cross-country skiers 
Olympic cross-country skiers of Croatia 
Cross-country skiers at the 2018 Winter Olympics 
Cross-country skiers at the 2012 Winter Youth Olympics